The French  Infantry Division was one of the oldest divisions of the French army.

Heads of the  Infantry Division
 22 March 1815:  Division General Donzelot
 .
 1870: General Martineau des Chenez
 .
 18 October 1873: General Bellecourt
 18 November 1878 – 10 January 1880: General Blot
 .
 28 February 1880 – 14 September 1880: General de Courcy
 11 November 1880: General Vilmette
 11 January 1882: General Bardin
 17 July 1887 – 24 February 1891: General Mathelin
 .
 4 April 1891 – 4 November 1891: General Swiney
 11 November 1891 – 9 January 1892: General Peting de Vaulgrenant
 .
 24 May 1894 – 26 October 1899: General Strohl
 28 October 1899 – 11 May 1905: General de Germiny
 .
 17 June 1905: General Bertrand
 30 September 1905: General de Chomer
 25 March 1906: General Durand
 20 July 1907 – 31 May 1908: General de Chomer
 .
 17 June 1908 – 18 July 1911: General Cramezel de Kerhué
 28 July 1911 – 20 March 1914: General Bizart
 .
 2 August 1914: General Deligny
 8 September 1914: Colonel Garnier-Duplessix 
 21 September 1914: General Brulard
 16 July 1915: General Guignadaudet
 17 June 1917 – 15 July 1920: General Mignot
 .
 27 August 1940 – 10 November 1940: General Etcheberrigarray

The Hundred Days
Schmitz brigade, commanded by Brigade General Nicolas Schmitz.
 Light Infantry Regiment
 Line Infantry Regiment
Aulard brigade, commanded by Brigade General Pierre Aulard.
 Line Infantry Regiment
 Line Infantry Regiment
 company of the  Foot Artillery Regiment, with 8 troops.

1870 War
The division was part of the Rhine Army, commanded by Marshall Mac Mahon.

Composition :
 Line Infantry Regiment
 Line Infantry Regiment
 Line Infantry Regiment
 Algerian Tirailleur Regiment

After the dissolution of the Imperial Army, it joined the new Armée de la Loire, commanded by General Louis d'Aurelle de Paladines.

 Infantry Division : General Martineau des Chenez

 Brigade : General Dariés
 Marching Battalion: Commandant Chamard
 Line Regiment: Colonel Jouffroy
Foreign Legion : Lieutenant-Colonel de Curten
 Mobile Regiment (Gironde) : Lieutenant-Colonel d'Artigolles

 Brigade : General Rébillard
 Zouave Regiment: Lieutenant-Colonel Logerot
 Marching Regiment: Lieutenant-Colonel Bernard de Seigneurens
 Mobile Regiment (Maine-et-Loire): Lieutenant-Colonel de Paillot

Artillery :
 battery of the  Regiment: Captain Pariaud
 battery of the  Regiment: Captain Grosclerc
 battery of the Mounted Guard Regiment: Captain Chastang
Engineers :  section of the  company of the  Regiment

First World War

Composition during the War

The  Infantry Division was mobilised in the  Military Region in August 1914. Its infantry was originally organized as two brigades. In November 1916, the division was triangularized. The two regiments of the 3rd Brigade were sent to the 51st Infantry Division, while those of the 4th Brigade, and the newly attached 208th (which came from the 51st Division) went directly under divisional command.

Infantry
3rd Brigade
 Infantry Regiment from August 1914 to November 1916
 Infantry Regiment from August 1914 to November 1916
4th Brigade
 Infantry Regiment from August 1914 to armistice (under direct divisional control from November 1916)
 Infantry Regiment from August 1914 to armistice (under direct divisional control from November 1916)
  Infantry Regiment from November 1916 to armistice
 A battalion of pioneers from the  Territorial Infantry Regiment from August 1918 to armistice
Artillery
  Field Artillery Regiment from the mobilisation to armistice
  battery from July 1916 to January 1918
  battery from January 1918 to armistice
 6th Artillery Group from 15 June 1918 to armistice
Cavalry
 1st Squadron/ Chasseur Regiment from mobilisation to armistice
Engineers
  Engineers Regiment
 1/2 Company from mobilisation to armistice
 1/2 bis Company from January 1915 to January 1916
 1/52 Company from January 1916 to armistice
 1/71 Company from January 1917 to armistice
 Sappers from the 21st Regiment from January 1916 to January 1917

History

1914
4–13 August
Transport by railroad to the region of Auvillers-les-Forges and crossing the Meuse to reach Revin and Givet.
13–23 August
 Movement, via Olloy, to Dinant.
 15 August, combat at Dinant, formed defence in front of the Meuse, via Dinant and Anbée.
 22 August, movement towards Charleroi.
23–29 August
 Engaged in the Battle of Charleroi, via Saint-Gérard.
 24 August, return, via Couvin, to the region of Guise
 26 August, combat at Gué-d'Hossus.
29 August – 6 September
 Engaged in the  Battle of Guise ; combat at Sains-Richaumont.
 30 August, return, via Crécy-sur-Serre, Pontavert and Baizil, to the South of Esternay.
6–13 September
 Engaged in the  Battle of the Marne.
 6–10 September, Battle of Deux Morins : Combat in Esternay, Bergères-sous-Montmirail and Fontaine-Chacun.
 10 September, continue, via Verneuil and Ville-Dommange, until Reims.
13 September – 12 December
 Engaged in the  Battle of Aisne : combat in the region of Bétheny, la Neuvillette.
 16 September, movement along the road heading North-West ; combat at Cholera Farm and towards la Ville-aux-Bois. Stabilisation and occupation of a sector towards Gernicourt and Beau marais Forest, heading left, on 15 October, until the moulin Pontoy, and to the right, on 1 November, until cote 108
 12–14 October, French attack on Cholera Farm and the Ville-aux-Bois Forest.
 4 November, attack and capture of Sapigneul.
 11 November, capture of cote 108.
12 December 1914 – 12 January 1915
 Retreat from the front towards Fismes.
 16 December, transport by van to Cuperly.
 20 December or thereabouts, movement to La Cheppe, heading to Laval, to take part in the  Battle of Champagne: Engaged on 9 January 1915, North of Mesnil-lès-Hurlus.

1915
12–20 January
 Retreat from the front and back to Bussy-le-Château.
20 January – 2 March
 Occupation of the sector towards Mesnil-lès-Hurlus
 16 March, French attack on les Mamelles, leading to violent combat in the region (Battle of Champagne)
2 March – 5 April
 Retrait from the front and back to Courtisols (arriving 14 March)
 20 and 21 March, movement to the region of Avize ; rest.
 29 March, transport by van towards Vavincourt, then, at the end of  April, movement towards the South-East of Verdun.
5–11 April
 Engaged in the 1st Battle of la Woëvre, towards Buzy Forest and the East of Braquis.
11–29 April
 Retreat from the front (arriving on 18th) ; further movement, via Souilly and Les Hauts-de-Chée, to Commercy.
29 April – 11 May
 Movement towards the front ; 30 April, attack on Ailly Forest, leading to occupation of a sector towards Ailly Forest
 5 May, German attack, and French counter-attack.
11–15 May
 Retreat from the front, and transport by van to the regions of Épernay and Fismes.
15 May – 3 September
 Movement towards the front and occupation of a sector of Berry-au-Bac and the moulin Pontoy, reduced to the right, on 18 August, to la Miette, then, on 31 August, up to la Ville-aux-Bois.
3 September – 2 October
 Retreat from the front, and rest at Guyencourt.
2 October 1915 – 12 February 1916
 Movement to the front, and occupation of a sector of Sapigneul and la Miette.
 12 November, movement along the road, and occupation of a new sector between Berry-au-Bac and Temple Farm, extended to the left, on 20 November, up to the Pontoy windmill:
 Battle of Mines at cote 108.

1916
12–21 February
 Retreat from the front and regrouping at Ville-en-Tardenois ; rest and instruction.
21 February – 8 March
 Transport by train, movement to the region of Verdun.
 26 February, engaged by accident in the Battle of Verdun, at Douaumont (violent combat)
8 March – 14 April
 Retreat from the front and rest at Bar-le-Duc.
  April, transport by van to the region of Dormans ; rest.
 11 April, movement to Fismes.
14 April – 24 July
 Occupation of a sector between the road from Paissy to Chermizy-Ailles and Soupir, reduced to the right on 17 July up to Troyon.
24 July – 3 September
 Retreat from the front and rest at Ville-en-Tardenois.
 7 August, transport by truck to the region of Conty.
 Rest south-west of Amiens until 25 August, towards Corbie.
3 September – 5 October
 Movement to the front ; engaged in the Battle of the Somme, towards le Forest and the Forest of Maurepas
 14 September, capture of Priez farm.
 19–26 September, capture of the  line (further battles in the area, and the capture of Combles, on the 26th)
 27 September, again engaged, towards Combles and Morval, leading to Combles and Frégicourt (former municipality reunited with Combles in 1834).
5–9 October
 Retreat from the front and rest at Conty.
9–16 October
 Transport by van to the region of Châlons-sur-Marne and rest at Somme-Vesle.
16 October – 30 November
 Movement to the front and occupation of a sector at Maisons de Champagne and the butte du Mesnil.
30 November – 14 December
 Retreat from the front, and rest at Possesse.
14 December 1916 – 6 January 1917
 Movement to the camp at Mailly, rest and instruction.

1917
6 January – 27 February
 Gradual movement to the front, while occupying a sector covering Maisons de Champagne and la Courtine
 15 February, violent German attack.
21 February – 6 March
 Retreat from the front, movement through the region of Sainte-Menehould, via Dampierre-le-Château, l'Épine, Sarry, Athis and Vinay.
6 March – 8 April
 Movement via Dormans ; instruction (work at the Aisne)
8–19 April
 Movement to the front and occupation of a sector covering Craonne and le Ployron.
 16 April, engaged in the  Battle of the Aisne : combat on the Craonne plateau; defence, and organisation of their captured positions.
19 April – 7 July
 Retreat from the front and rest at Ventelay ; from 25 April, rest at Viels-Maisons.
 9 May, gradual movement towards the camp at Mailly ; rest and instruction.
 15 June, gradual movement towards Provins ; rest and instruction.
7–30 July
 Transport by van to Flandres.
 14 July, movement of the infantry to the front and occupation of a sector covering Het-Sas (under the orders of the  D.I.)
30 July – 4 August
 Retrait from the front ; rest in the region of Roesbrugge-Haringe.
4–22 August
 Mouvement towards the front and rest in the region of Bikschote
 16 August, offensive against Martje Vaert and Broenbeck (Battle of Langemarck – part of the Battle of Passchendaele)
22 August – 6 October
 Retreat from the front; rest and instruction in the region of West-Cappel.
6–16 October
 Occupation of a sector north of Bixschoote and Langemark (together with the British Army) :
 9 October, offensive in the forest of Houthulst, attack on Mangelaare (part of the Battle of Poelcappelle).
16 October – 21 November
 Retreat from the front, then rest, instruction and work at Bergues.
21 November – 7 December
 Occupation of a sector north of Langemarck and Kloosterschool (together with the British front)
7 December 1917 – 17 January 1918
 Retreat from the front (relieved by the British Army). Rest at Gravelines.
 11 December, gradual movement to the region of Senlis ; rest.

1918
17 January – 20 March
 Gradual movement to Soissons
 22 January, work on the  position in the region.
 8 February, gradual movement towards Roucy ; then work on the  position in the region.
20–31 March
 Movement towards the front and occupation of a sector in the region of Miette, Ployon.
31 March – 20 May: Retreat from the front; movement towards Fismes, and, on 3 April, towards Écuiry ; rest.
 14 April, bridging the Oise towards Choisy-au-Bac.
 2 May, movement towards Warluis ; rest. Led to work on the  position in the region of Beauvais.
20–31 May
 Movement towards Marseille-en-Beauvaisis.
 28 May, transport by train south to Compiègne.
 Soon afterwards, to Montigny-Lengrain, to join the Third Battle of the Aisne.
31 May – 18 July
 Movement to the front and occupation of a sector covering Dammard and Troësnes: frequent local actions, particularly on 29, 30 June and 1 July, to the east of Mosloy.
18–27 July
 Engaged, at Troësnes to the south, in the Battle of soissonnais et l'Ourq (Second Battle of the Marne)
 Progression towards Épaux-Bézu and through the region of Rocourt-Saint-Martin northward.
27 July – 19 August
 Retreat from the front ; movement towards Mareuil-sur-Ourcq, then to Pierrefonds ; rest.
19–29 August
 Movement to Vic-sur-Aisne and occupation of a sector north of Autrêches.
 Engaged in the  Battle of Noyon, at l'Ailette, via Pont-Saint-Mard.
29 August – 11 September
 Retreat from the front and rest at Pont-Sainte-Maxence.
11 September – 28 October
 Transport via van to Alsace ; from 15 September, occupation of a sector covering Burnhaupt-le-Haut and Leimbach.
28 October – 11 November
 Retreat from the front and gradual movement to Ceintrey ; preparing offensive.

Hierarchy
The division was part of the 1ier Corps d'Armée from mobilisation in August 1914 until the Armistice of 11 November 1918.

The Second World War
Under the order of battle of 10 May 1940, the  Infantry Division joined the Colonial Army Corps (with the 51st (Highland) Infantry Division and the 56th (London) Infantry Division), under the command of General Condé of the Third French Army.

Structure of the division in 1939:

 Chief of Staff, 2nd Infantry Division – Major Villate
 Components, 2nd Infantry Division
 33rd Infantry Regiment
 73rd Infantry Regiment
 127th Infantry Regiment
 34th Divisional Artillery Regiment
 234th Division Heavy Artillery Regiment

Notes and references

External links
 The 2nd DI in the Battle of the Aisne (1917)
 
 

Infantry divisions of France
Infantry Division, 2nd
Military units and formations established in 1914
Infantry Division, 2nd
Infantry Division, 2nd
1914 establishments in France